Interstate 2 (I-2) is a partially completed Interstate Highway running through the Lower Rio Grande Valley of South Texas. It begins at the intersection of US Highway 83 (US 83) and Business US 83 (Bus. US 83) in Peñitas and heads eastward before terminating at I-69E/US 77/US 83 in Harlingen. For its entire length, I-2 runs concurrently with US 83. I-2 also parallels Mexican Federal Highway 2 (Fed. 2), another major east–west route that traces the Mexico–US border along the Mexican side of the Rio Grande. When completed, the western terminus will be the city of Laredo. The route is one of the more recently designated Interstate Highways; it was signed as an Interstate in 2013. Its construction is part of an expansion of the Interstate System into southern Texas that includes the three branches of I-69. It currently intersects I-69E and I-69C and will, when complete to Laredo, intersect I-69W as well. This complex of Interstate Highways does not yet connect to the rest of the system.

Route description
I-2 begins at an at-grade intersection with US 83 and Bus. US 83 in Peñitas. The Interstate heads eastward as a four-lane freeway through the Lower Rio Grande Valley. The route curves southeastward around Mission and McAllen to the south, running near McAllen Miller International Airport. The route curves northeastward around Pharr, where it intersects with I-69C/US 281 north of the city center. Continuing eastward, the route passes by many small cities, roughly paralleling Bus. US 83. The route ends at an interchange with I-69E/US 77/US 83 in Harlingen.

History

On April 1, 2013, the Texas Department of Transportation (TxDOT) applied to use the I-2 designation on US 83 from Palmview to Harlingen. Approved by the American Association of State Highway and Transportation Officials at their May meeting, this  freeway was already constructed as an Interstate-grade limited-access facility. It connects with I-69E at Harlingen; and likewise with I-69C in the city of Pharr. The Federal Highway Administration approved the designation on May 24, 2013, and TxDOT followed suit on May 30, 2013. This action finalized the designations of not only I-2 but also of the sections of I-69E from Brownsville to Raymondville, I-69C from Pharr north to the end of the US 281 freeway facility near Edinburg, and also I-369 along a short segment of US 59 freeway west of Texarkana, which will be part of the proposed  connector between the main I-69 trunk in Tenaha and Texarkana. The signage was installed in mid-2013.

, the cluster consisting of the recently designated portions of I-2, I-69C, and I-69E in the Rio Grande Valley is not connected to the national Interstate network. This situation is slated to be remedied by scheduled projects to complete I-69E along US 77 between Raymondville and Robstown and to complete the southern end of the previously signed portion of the I-69 corridor connecting with I-37 west of Corpus Christi. Environmental Protection Agency approval for the expansion of the US 77 alignment to Interstate standards, including bypasses of the towns along the  routing, was obtained through a Finding of No Significant Impact statement issued on July 13, 2012;

Future
Due to increasing congestion, a  segment of future I-2 bypassing La Joya is currently under construction in two phases, which is set for completion in May 2023. Both phases of the segment from west of Palmview to east of Sullivan City will cost $183 million according to TxDOT.

Exit list
The exit numbers are set up to reflect the likely future western terminus of I-2, which would be in Laredo.

See also

Notes

References

External links

 Interstate-guide.com: Interstate 2

02
02
Transportation in Hidalgo County, Texas
Transportation in Cameron County, Texas
2013 establishments in Texas
U.S. Route 83